The 1932–33 William & Mary Indians men's basketball team represented the College of William & Mary as a member of Virginia Conference during the 1932–33 NCAA men's basketball season. Led by fourth-year head coach John Kellison, the Indians compiled an overall record of 13–5 with a mark of 11–0 in conference play, winning the Virginia Conference title. This was the 28th season of the collegiate basketball program at William & Mary, whose nickname is now the Tribe.

Schedule

References

William and Mary
William & Mary Tribe men's basketball seasons
William and Mary Indians basketball, men's
William and Mary Indians basketball, men's